Claude Bowes-Lyon, 13th Earl of Strathmore and Kinghorne (21 July 182416 February 1904), styled The Honourable Claude Bowes-Lyon from 1847 to 1865, was a British peer. He was the 13th holder of the Earldom of Strathmore and Kinghorne, the paternal grandfather of Queen Elizabeth The Queen Mother, a great-grandfather of Elizabeth II, and great-great-grandfather of Charles III.

Life 
He was born in Redbourn, Hertfordshire. He was the second surviving son of Thomas George Lyon-Bowes, Lord Glamis (son of the 11th Earl), and his wife Charlotte Grimstead. His paternal grandparents were Thomas Lyon-Bowes, 11th Earl of Strathmore and Kinghorne, and his first wife Mary Elizabeth Louisa Rodney Carpenter. His maternal grandparents were Joseph Valentine Grimstead, of Ewood Park and Merry Hall, Ashtead, Surrey, and his wife Charlotte Jane Sarah Walsh. Born Claude Lyon-Bowes, he altered the family name to Bowes-Lyon.

Bowes-Lyon also played cricket, making four appearances in first-class cricket, appearing three times for the Marylebone Cricket Club between 1843 and 1846, and once for the Gentlemen of England in 1846. In 1865 he succeeded his elder brother Thomas. The Canadian Pacific Railway named Strathmore, Alberta in his honour in 1884. In 1887 he was created Baron Bowes, of Streatlam Castle and Lunedale, in the Peerage of the United Kingdom. He was a Scottish representative peer from 1870 until 1892, and Lord Lieutenant of Angus from 1874 until his death.

He died in Bordighera, the Italian Riviera, in his Villa Etelinda, so named for the opera composed by his daughter Lady Mildred Marion. The villa was later sold to the Italian Royal Family.

Marriage and family 
On 28 September 1853, Claude married Frances Dora Smith (29 July 18325 February 1922). They had 11 children:
 Claude Bowes-Lyon, 14th Earl of Strathmore and Kinghorne (14 March 18557 November 1944), the father of Queen Elizabeth The Queen Mother and grandfather of Queen Elizabeth II. He married Cecilia Cavendish-Bentinck (11 September 186223 June 1938) on 16 July 1881. They had 10 children.
 Francis Bowes-Lyon (23 February 185618 February 1948), married Lady Anne Lindsay (24 December 185815 December 1936) on 23 November 1883. They had 7 children. 
 Ernest Bowes-Lyon (4 August 185827 December 1891), married Isobel Hester Drummond (21 May 186015 July 1945) on 23 August 1882. They had 6 children.
 Herbert Bowes-Lyon (15 August 186014 April 1897), never married. 
 Patrick Bowes-Lyon (5 March 18635 October 1946), a major of the British Army and a tennis player. He married Alice Wiltshire (18671 March 1953) on 9 August 1893. They had 4 children.
 Lady Constance Frances Bowes-Lyon (8 October 186519 November 1951), married Robert Blackburn (27 April 186421 March 1944) on 21 December 1893. They had 4 children.
 Kenneth Bowes-Lyon (26 April 18679 January 1911), never married.
 Lady Mildred Marion Bowes-Lyon (18689 June 1897), a music composer, famous for Etelinda (an opera premiered in Florence in 1894). She married Augustus Jessup (20 June 186116 October 1925) on 1 July 1890. They had 2 children.
 Lady Maud Agnes Bowes-Lyon (12 June 187028 February 1941), never married.
 Lady Evelyn Mary Bowes-Lyon (16 July 187215 March 1876), died in infancy.
 Maj. Malcolm Bowes-Lyon (23 April 187423 August 1957), a lieutenant colonel of the British Army. He married Winifred Gurdon-Rebow (10 October 187630 May 1957) on 28 September 1907. They had a daughter.

Ancestry

References

External links 
 

1824 births
1904 deaths
People from Redbourn
Claude Bowes-Lyon
13
Bowes, Thomas Bowes-Lyon, 1st Baron
Peers of the United Kingdom created by Queen Victoria
English cricketers
Marylebone Cricket Club cricketers
Gentlemen of England cricketers
British expatriates in Italy
Deaths in Italy